Brian Temba (born 9 December 1977) is a South African actor, performer, singer, songwriter and producer. He was born in the Eastern Cape province. He speaks four languages. He is known for his role as Ranthumeng Mokoena in the South African soap opera Muvhango and his role as Simba in the West End musical The Lion King.

Career

Theatre
Simba in The Lion King (2003–2008: West End)
u/s Simba/Ensemble in The Lion King (2000–2001: Panteges Theatre, Los Angeles)
Ensemble in Lion and the lamb (1999: Market Theatre, South Africa)

Television
Omar in Hip-Hop Opera (Urban Concepts, London)
Featured Artist in Back stage (ETV)
Brian in Generations (SABC 1)
guest at The Jay Leno Show (Los Angeles)
guest at Felicia Mabuza-Suttle (South Africa)
Ranthumeng Mokoena in "Muvhango (South African TV series)"(SABC 2)

Recordings
 Joyous Celebration Tenor Singer on Joyous Celebration 4 (2000)
Amazing Grace (film soundtrack)
Roger and Sam Grandison Live in London, featured on track Awesome Wonder
Mamani by Joy Denalane (2002)
 Something Better by Brian Temba (2010)
 T.I.M.T This Is My Time By Brian Temba (2012)

References

External links
Brian Temba official site 
spotlight link Spotlight Link CV

South African musicians
1977 births
Living people